Agrest is a surname. People with this surname include:

 Matest M. Agrest (1915–2005), Russian ethnologist and mathematician
 Evgeny Agrest (born 1966), Belarusian-Swedish chess grandmaster
 Diana Agrest (born 1945), US-Argentinian architect 
 Mikhail Agrest, Russian conductor
 Adrien Agreste and his father, Gabriel Agreste, from Miraculous: Tales of Ladybug & Cat Noir (French animated TV series)